Loveday Enyinnaya (born 28 November 1989) is a Nigerian professional footballer.

Career
Born in Warri, Nigeria, Enyinnaya started his career with Malabar United of the I-League 2nd Division in 2010. He then went on to join Rangdajied United, then Ar-Hime, in 2011 and participated with the club in the Shillong Premier League and the I-League 2nd Division. He then joined Royal Wahingdoh and played for the side in the 2nd Division in 2014, helping them secure promotion to the I-League.

He made his professional debut for the side on 28 December 2014 in the Federation Cup against Mumbai.

Honours
Rangdajied United
I-League 2nd Division: 2013
Shillong Premier League: 2013
Sporting Clube de Goa
Goa Professional League: 2015–16,
Real Kashmir
I-League 2nd Division: 2017–18

References

1989 births
Living people
People from Umuahia
Nigerian footballers
Rangdajied United F.C. players
Royal Wahingdoh FC players
Association football defenders
I-League 2nd Division players
Expatriate footballers in India
Real Kashmir FC players